Hans Bernhardt (28 January 1906 – 29 November 1940) was a German cyclist. He won the bronze medal in the Men's tandem event at the 1928 Summer Olympics.

Bernhardt, member of the Wehrmacht, was killed during World War II in the Netherlands.

References

German male cyclists
German military personnel killed in World War II
1906 births
1940 deaths
Olympic bronze medalists for Germany
Cyclists at the 1928 Summer Olympics
Olympic cyclists of Germany
Olympic medalists in cycling
Sportspeople from Leipzig
People from the Kingdom of Saxony
Medalists at the 1928 Summer Olympics
Cyclists from Saxony
20th-century German people